Dennis E. Taylor is a Canadian novelist and former computer programmer known for his large scale hard science fiction stories exploring the interaction between artificial intelligence and the human condition.

Writing 
While working at his day job as a computer programmer, Taylor self-published his first novel and began working with an agent to try to publish his second novel We Are Legion. However, Taylor still had difficulty getting any publishing house to take on his work, and eventually published it through his agent's in-house publishing arm. An audiobook rights deal with Audible was also reached. Once recorded, We Are Legion became one of the most popular audiobooks on the service and was awarded Best Science Fiction Audiobook of the year.

Taylor has been noted as one of many popular authors that debut their work in audio form rather than print to take advantage of the explosive growth of the audio medium.

Taylor's 2018 novel The Singularity Trap as well as his 2020 novel Heaven's River debuted on the New York Times Bestseller List for Fiction Audiobooks.

In September 2020, Taylor released his sixth novel Heaven's River, a sequel in the "Bobiverse" series. The new novel follows a loose thread from the earlier novels involving the Bob clone named "Bender", who had disappeared mysteriously many years before and prompts a galaxy spanning search.

Major themes

Taylor's "Bobiverse" series explore how technologies like cryonics, mind uploading and artificial intelligence might change the society and the human condition. Another major topic is global catastrophic risk, which is also featured in Outland and The Singularity Trap.

The Stern magazine praised Taylor's distinctive humour style, often based on nerdy inside jokes and references.

Personal life 
Taylor lives outside Vancouver, Canada with his wife Blaihin and daughter Tina and enjoys snowboarding and mountain biking when he isn't writing or traveling.

Works

Novels

Short Stories

Recognition 
Taylor's works have been translated to several languages, including Japanese, German, French and Polish.

The We Are Legion (We Are Bob) novel was a finalist of the 2019 Seiun Awards.

In October 2018, Taylor was added to the X-Prize Foundation Science Fiction Advisory Council as a "Visionary Storyteller". This group of accomplished science fiction authors help advise the X-Prize team on envisioning the future.

In May 2019, Taylor was invited to Google to one of the "Talks at Google" where he gave some insight into what inspired his writings, and what his plans are for the next few years.

See also
Von Neumann probe
The Singularity
Topopolis

References

External links 

 

Canadian computer programmers
Canadian science fiction writers
Living people
Year of birth missing (living people)